Paul Kelly may refer to:

Academia
 Paul Kelly (mathematician) (1915–1995), American mathematician
 Paul Kelly (journalist) (born 1947), Australian journalist
 Paul Kelly (lawyer) (born c. 1955), American lawyer and former NHL Players Association executive director
 Paul Kelly (professor) (born 1962), British political theorist
 Paul Kelly (doctor), an epidemiologist who is currently Chief Medical Officer of Australia

Sportspeople
 Paul Kelly (cricketer) (born 1960), New Zealand cricketer
 Paul Kelly (Australian rules footballer) (born 1969), Australian rules footballer
 Paul Kelly (footballer, born 1969), English footballer
 Paul Kelly (soccer) (born 1974), American soccer player
 Paul Kelly (hurler) (born 1979), Irish hurler
 Paul Kelly (fighter) (born 1984), British martial artist

Music and film
 Paul Kelly (actor) (1899–1956), American stage and screen actor
 Paul Kelly (American musician) (1940–2012), American soul singer-songwriter
 Paul Kelly (Australian musician) (born 1955), Australian rock, folk and country musician
 Paul Kelly (Irish musician) (born 1957), Irish traditional, bluegrass and country musician
 Paul Austin Kelly (born 1960), American opera tenor and former rock musician
 Paul Kelly (film maker) (born 1962), British film maker and musician

Politics
 Paul Joseph Kelly Jr. (born 1940), US federal judge
 Paul V. Kelly (born 1947), Assistant Secretary of State for Legislative Affairs, 2001–2005
 Paul Kelly (politician) (born 1963), Canadian politician

Other
 Paul Kelly (criminal) (1876–1936), American criminal and founder of the Five Points Gang

See also
 Anthony Paul Kelly (1897–1932), American screenwriter
 John Paul Kelly (disambiguation), several people
 Paul Kelly: Stories of Me, 2012 Australian documentary directed by Ian Darling
 Paul X. Kelley (1928–2019), twenty-eighth Commandant of the United States Marine Corps